Susana Cora was a Mexican film actress. She appeared in eighteen films, mostly during the Golden Age of Mexican cinema where she appeared in mixture of leading and supporting roles. She was the daughter of General Luis Amezcua and  married Charles (Chick) Hill, the brother of  Virginia Hill, the last girlfriend of Bugsy Siegel.

Selected filmography
 Jesusita in Chihuahua (1942)
 Cuando habla el corazón (1943)
 A Day with the Devil (1945)
 Adventure in the Night (1948)

References

Bibliography
 Vogel, Michelle. Lupe Velez: The Life and Career of Hollywood's "Mexican Spitfire". McFarland, 2012.

External links

Year of birth unknown
Year of death unknown
Mexican film actresses
20th-century Mexican actresses